Mackinac Island meteorite was found on Mars by the Opportunity rover on October 13, 2009.

History
Mackinac Island was the third of three iron meteorites encountered by the rover on Meridiani Planum within a few hundred meters, the others being Shelter Island and Block Island.

Mackinac Island may have fallen on Mars in the late Noachian period and is extensively weathered.

See also

 Atmospheric reentry
 Bounce Rock
 Glossary of meteoritics
 Heat Shield Rock
 List of Martian meteorites
 List of meteorites on Mars
 Oileán Ruaidh meteorite
List of surface features of Mars imaged by Opportunity

References

2009 in science
Mackinac Island
Meteorites found on Mars
Rocks on Mars